Gustavo Colonnetti (8 November 1886 – 20 March 1968) was an Italian mathematician and engineer who made important contributions to continuum mechanics and strength of materials. He was a Rector of the Politecnico di Torino and President of CNR (Consiglio Nazionale delle Ricerche). His theories found important applications in modern techniques of construction, such as pre-stressed concrete.

He is remembered for Colonnetti's theorem (or Colonnetti's minimum principle) which states that in equilibrium the potential energy function  is minimized.

Life

Honors
He was nominated member of the Pontificial Academy of Sciences on October 28, 1936. In 1947, during the first meeting of the RILEM in Sorrento, he was elected first president of the society, and began its mandate in 1948. The same year, on the 27th of August 1947, he was elected corresponding member of the Accademia Nazionale dei Lincei: nearly a year later, on the 15th of July 1948, he was elected full member.

Work

Research activity

Teaching activity

Selected publications

.
.

Notes

References

Biographical references

. The "Yearbook" of the renowned Italian scientific institution, including an historical sketch of its history, the list of all past and present members as well as a wealth of information about its academic and scientific activities.
.
. The text of the address of Gaetano Fichera given on the occasion of the conferment of the laurea honoris causa in civil engineering: he describes the history of the theory of elasticity detailing particularly the contributions of Italian scientists.
. A work dealing with the contributions of Gustavo Colonnetti and Arturo Danusso to the development of Italian  engineering science, presented at the Second National Conference on the History of Engineering, organized by the Associazione Italiana di Storia dell'Ingegneria (A.I.S.I.), the Italian Association for the History of Engineering, and held in Napoli on April 7–8, 2008.
.
. The biographical entry about Gustavo Colonnetti in the "Dizionario Biografico degli Italiani (Biographical Dictionary of Italians)" section of the Enciclopedia Treccani.

References describing his research work

 .

External links 
Brief biography
Gustavo Colonnetti e le origini dell'ingegneria in Italia, Fausto Giovannardi

1886 births
1968 deaths
Scientists from Turin
Members of the National Council (Italy)
Italian civil engineers
Mathematical physicists
19th-century Italian mathematicians
20th-century Italian mathematicians
Engineers from Turin
National Research Council (Italy) people